Jim Panagos (born 1975) is an American football coach who is the defensive tackles coach at the University of Kansas.

Coaching career

Minnesota Vikings
Panagos joined the Minnesota Vikings as an offensive assistant and quality control coach in 2002.  His title was defensive quality control coach from 2003–2004. In 2005, he was named assistant defensive line coach and assistant special teams coach.

UCF Knights
Panagos was the defensive line coach at the University of Central Florida from 2007 to 2011.

Rutgers
After leaving UCF, Panagos served as the defensive line coach for Rutgers underneath Kyle Flood from 2012–15.<ref>{{Cite web |url=http://www.scarletknights.com/sports/m-footbl/mtt/jim_panagos_926458.html |title="/>

Pittsburgh
Panagos spent the 2016 season as a defensive consultant with Pittsburgh

Temple
In January 2017, Panagos was named the defensive line coach for Temple underneath new Temple coach Geoff Collins. Panagos had previously worked with Collins at UCF. During his first season at Temple, Panagos led a defensive line that finished No. 11 in the nation in sacks. Panagos was named a semi-finalist for the Broyles Award, given annually to the nation's top assistant coach.

Minnesota
In 2019, Panagos was the defensive line coach for Minnesota.

Return to Rutgers
On December 14, 2019 it was announced that Jim was leaving Minnesota to return to Rutgers to once again be their defensive line coach.

Kansas
In January of 2022, Panagos joined Lance Leipold's staff at Kansas as the defensive tackles coach.

References

External links
 Minnesota profile

1971 births
Living people
American football defensive tackles
Maryland Terrapins football coaches
Maryland Terrapins football players
Minnesota Golden Gophers football coaches
Minnesota Vikings coaches
Temple Owls football coaches
UCF Knights football coaches
Rutgers Scarlet Knights football coaches
High school football coaches in Florida
Sportspeople from Brooklyn
Players of American football from New York City